Brendan McGahon (22 November 1936 – 8 February 2017) was an Irish Fine Gael politician who served as a Teachta Dála (TD) for the Louth constituency from 1982 to 2002.

Often described as 'colourful', with a reputation as a social conservative, McGahon was first elected to Dáil Éireann at the November 1982 general election and retained his seat until retiring at the 2002 general election.

Early life
McGahon was born in Dundalk, County Louth, and was educated at St. Mary's College in Dundalk. His grandfather, T.F. McGahon, was one of the inaugural members of Dundalk Urban District Council when it was created along with other Irish local authorities by the British Government in 1898. T.F. McGahon was a leading member of the Irish Parliamentary Party (IPP). He started a local newspaper, the Dundalk Democrat which was supportive of the IPP. T.F. was a critic of the War of Independence campaign, of Sinn Féin, and of the then IRA, arguing that the campaign would result in the partition of Ireland. He was later succeeded on the council by his son, O.B. McGahon who in turn was followed by his nephew, Hugh McGahon. The family subsequently supported the National League Party and the Independent TD James Coburn and joined Fine Gael when Coburn joined the party. They were also prominent members of the Ancient Order of Hibernians.

Brendan married Celine Lundy, a widow from Newry, County Down, and took over the running of the family newspaper business in the 1960s and  He played soccer for Dundalk F.C. in the Premier Division for a number of years.

Political career
McGahon succeeded his cousin Hugh, on Dundalk Town Council and on Louth County Council at the 1979 local elections. McGahon was an unsuccessful candidate at the 1981 general election and at the February 1982 general election. He was first elected to Dáil Éireann for Louth at the November 1982 general election, defeating incumbent Fine Gael TD, Bernard Markey. He was re-elected at the next five general elections.

A notable aspect of his political career was his stand against the Provisional IRA when that organisation's campaign of violence was at its height. At great personal risk he refused to close his newsagents shop in Dundalk during the funerals of the hunger strikers in 1981. He took another huge risk a few years later when he gave evidence in the High Court is support of the Sunday Times, which was being sued for libel by Thomas Murphy for accusing him of directing an IRA bombing campaign in Britain. Local gardaí were ordered not to get involved in that case but McGahon was not deterred from giving evidence that helped the newspaper to defend the claims being made against it by Murphy.

A maverick and outspoken TD he was known to speak his mind on many issues including divorce, crime, and single mothers. He once advocated that paedophiles should be castrated as part of their prison sentence and was the only TD to oppose the referendum to abolish the death penalty from the Constitution. He also argued that those aged under 21 years of age should not be able to drive or drink, he was a member of the World anti-Communist League and opposed the decriminalisation of homosexuality. In 1993, he was the only TD to oppose the decriminalisation of homosexuality and said in the Dail that: 

On the other hand, he spoke out strongly against the influence of the drink industry and defied his own party whip to vote with his left-wing friend Tony Gregory in favour of banning of hare-coursing. He was also on good personal terms with members of the Oireachtas such as Michael D. Higgins and David Norris despite holding fundamentally opposed views to them.

He did not contest the 2002 general election and retired from politics.

Personal life
McGahon lived in Ravensdale, County Louth. His son Conor was a Louth County Councillor from 1991 to 1999 and his brother Johnny was a Louth County Councillor from 1995 to 2004. Johnny's son John McGahon was elected to Louth County Council at the 2014 local elections and to Seanad Éireann in 2020.

References

1936 births
2017 deaths
Conservatism in Ireland
Fine Gael TDs
Irish anti-communists
Local councillors in County Louth
Members of the 24th Dáil
Members of the 25th Dáil
Members of the 26th Dáil
Members of the 27th Dáil
Members of the 28th Dáil
People educated at St Mary's College, Dundalk
People from Dundalk